The Cal 29 is an American sailboat, that was designed by William Lapworth and first built in 1971.

A special cruising version was designated as the Cal 2-29.

Production
The boat was built by Cal Yachts in the United States, between 1971 and 1974, but it is now out of production.

The design was also built under licence by Calgan Marine in North Vancouver, Canada.

A total of 624 examples of the type were completed, making the Cal 29 one of the most commercially successful models built by Cal Yachts.

Design
The Cal 29 is a small recreational keelboat, built predominantly of fiberglass, with wood trim. It has a masthead sloop rig, an internally-mounted spade-type rudder and a fixed fin keel. It displaces  and carries  of ballast.

The boat is fitted with a Universal Atomic 4  gasoline engine.

The boat has a PHRF racing average handicap of 183 with a high of 198 and low of 180.

Variants
The Cal 2-29 was a special cruising version of the basic Cal 29, with the same hull and rigging. A total of 387 of this model were built between 1974 and 1974-1978.

See also
List of sailing boat types

Similar sailboats
Alberg 29
Bayfield 29 
C&C 29
Hunter 29.5
Hunter 290
Island Packet 29
Mirage 29
Northwind 29
Tanzer 29
Watkins 29

References

Keelboats
1970s sailboat type designs
Sailing yachts
Sailboat type designs by Bill Lapworth
Sailboat types built by Cal Yachts
Sailboat types built by Calgan Marine